Sageby Sandaka (born 17 June 1985) is a retired Zimbabwean football striker.

Career
Sandaka began playing club football in Zimbabwe. He moved to Botswana side Gaborone United in 2006, where he was top league goal-scorer with 14 goals in 13 matches.

He has been capped for the Zimbabwean national team.

Clubs
2003–2005:  Amazulu FC
2005–2006:  Monomotapa United FC
2006–2010:  Gaborone United
2011:  Mochudi Centre Chiefs
2011–2012:  BMC Lobatse
2012–2013:  Gaborone United
2013–2015:  BMC Lobatse

References

1985 births
Living people
Zimbabwean footballers
Zimbabwe international footballers
Zimbabwean expatriate footballers
Expatriate footballers in Botswana
Zimbabwean expatriate sportspeople in Botswana
Amazulu F.C. (Zimbabwe) players
Monomotapa United F.C. players
Mochudi Centre Chiefs SC players
Gilport Lions F.C. players
Gaborone United S.C. players
Association football forwards